Shelley High School is an institution for public education in the town of Shelley, Idaho. It is the city's only high school, and is nicknamed "the spud cellar" because of its unique mascot and resemblance to a potato cellar. The mascot, King Russet, is a Russet Burbank potato (the variety most commonly grown in the area) with a scepter and crown. The approximately 600 students, called Russets, receive two weeks of break in late September because some of them work in the local potato harvest.

The school has done well academically. For example, the 10th grade student body surpassed the state averages on the 2011 Idaho Standards Achievement Test in language, reading, and math. The class sizes (about 20 students per teacher) are a little above the state average of 18.

Shelley Senior High School has many sports teams including Basketball, Softball, Baseball, Football, Wrestling, Track, Golf, Cheer, and Soccer. Despite its small size, the high school has won several state football championships in its division, including the 2003, 2005, 2007, 2009, 2012, and 2013 championships. The school also has many clubs including FFA, Key Club, Drama, BPA, Speech & Debate, Art Club, and Aca Deca.

A notable graduate from this school was Curt Brinkman, a world record setting paraplegic athlete who in 1980 became the first person to win the Boston Marathon in a wheelchair, and went on to win five gold medals in the Paralympic Games. The park across the street from the high school is named in his honor.

Notable alumni 

 Curt Brinkman, Paralympic athlete
 Darwin Young (1924–2020), farmer and politician

References

Public high schools in Idaho
Schools in Bingham County, Idaho